Roberto Andino (born October 4, 1956) is a retired boxer from Puerto Rico, who competed in the men's lightweight division (– 60 kg). He represented his native country at the 1976 Summer Olympics in Montréal, Canada. Andino captured the silver medal at the 1979 Pan American Games.

1976 Olympic results
Below are the results of Roberto Andino, a lightweight boxer from Puerto Rico who competed at the 1976 Montreal Olympics:

 Round of 64: Defeated Gaetano Pirasta (Italy) on points, 5-0
 Round of 32: Lost to Ace Rusevski (Yugoslavia) referee stopped contest in the third round

References
 sports-reference

1956 births
Living people
Lightweight boxers
Boxers at the 1976 Summer Olympics
Olympic boxers of Puerto Rico
Puerto Rican male boxers
Boxers at the 1979 Pan American Games
Pan American Games silver medalists for Puerto Rico
Pan American Games medalists in boxing
Medalists at the 1979 Pan American Games